Russians in Spain form one of the country's smaller foreign communities, making up about 0.83% of all foreigners in Spain.

History
During the Spanish Civil War there were 72 White émigré volunteers on the Nationalist side, as well as some hundreds of Soviet advisors on the Republican side.

Foreign population of Russian citizenship in Spain

Notable individuals

References

Notes

Sources

Further reading

Ethnic groups in Spain